The Churachandpur district of Manipur state in India is divided into 10 subdivisions or blocks. This is a list of villages in present-day Churachandpur district as per the 2011 Census of India. In 2016, the Pherzawl district was carved out from the Churachandpur district, by separating Thanlon, Tipaimukh, and Vangai blocks.

Blocks 

As of 2022, the district has 10 administrative sub-divisions or blocks: Churachandpur (Lamka block), Tuibuong, Kangvai, Saikot, Sangaikot, Singhat, Henglep, Mualnuam, Samulamlan, and Suangdoh. The Thanlon, Tipaimukh, and Vangai blocks were once part of the Churachandpur district, but now come under the Pherzawl district formed in 2016.

At the time of the 2011 census, the present-day Churachandpur district had the following blocks:

Towns 

The district has three towns.

Villages

Other 

The following villages were part of the former Thanlon block, most of which is now part of the Pherzawl district formed in 2016.

Churachandpur North block

Churachandpur block

Singngat block

References 

Churachandpur